Água Boa is a  city in the Brazilian state of Minas Gerais. In 2020 its population was estimated to be 13,523.

The city of Água Boa is around 380 km from the state capital Belo Horizonte 
and the principal economic activity is the growing of cereal crops, the most important being corn, and livestock production where the soil is favorable for free-range cattle .

References

Municipalities in Minas Gerais